Charles Harrod may refer to:

 Charles Henry Harrod (1799–1885), English businessman who founded Harrods
 Charles Digby Harrod (1841–1905), his son, English businessman